Caseolus calculus (common name: Madeiran land snail) is a species of small air-breathing land snails, terrestrial pulmonate gastropod molluscs in the family Geomitridae, the hairy snails and their allies.

Distribution and conservation status
This species lives in Europe. It is mentioned in annexes II and IV of Habitats Directive.

References

External links 

calculus